International Federation of Societies for Microscopy
 IFSM – Forward surge current maximum. It is mainly used for diodes.